Jeffrey George Sluman (born September 11, 1957) is an American professional golfer who has won numerous professional golf tournaments including six PGA Tour victories.

Early years
Sluman was born and reared in Rochester, New York. After graduating from Greece Arcadia High School in 1975 and Monroe Community College in 1977, he attended Florida State University in Tallahassee, Florida. He earned a bachelor's degree with a major in finance from FSU in 1980, and turned pro later that year.

Professional career
Sluman has had an unusual career in terms of winning golf tournaments. During what are usually considered a golfers most productive years – their early twenties through their middle thirties – Sluman won only once. At the age of 30, he won the 1988 PGA Championship. Then, shortly before his 40th birthday, he started winning consistently on the Tour and in non-Tour events. After winning the 1997 Tucson Chrysler Classic, he won seven more events including four on the PGA Tour during the next seven seasons. Sluman's best season was in 2002 when he finished the year ranked 15th on the PGA Tour with $2,250,187 in earnings. Despite his rather unusual sequence in respect to tournament wins, Sluman has been one of the Tour's most consistent top 10 finishers throughout his career; his regular career earnings exceeded 18 million dollars.

The 1988 PGA Championship was played at the Oak Tree Golf Club in Edmond, Oklahoma. Sluman won the tournament by three strokes over Paul Azinger, shooting a total of 272. On the final day, Sluman took command of the tournament with a round of 65 that tied David Graham's 1979 mark as the lowest winning round in PGA history.

Upon turning 50 in September 2007, Sluman joined the Champions Tour. He won his first tournament in June 2008, the Bank of America Championship and he also won the First Tee Open in 2008, 2009, and 2011.

When Sluman won 1988 PGA Championship, Ping recognized him with a golden putter as a replica of the Ping PAL 2 he used to win. A second one was made and place in the Ping Gold putter vault.

During the first round of the 1992 Masters, Sluman made history when he recorded a hole-in-one on the fourth hole. To date, this is the only time the fourth hole has been aced at the Masters.

Other interests
In his spare time, Sluman can be described as a rabid sports fan. He closely follows the Florida State University Seminoles, the Chicago Bears, the Chicago Bulls, and the Chicago Cubs. He has held Bulls season tickets for over 10 years. Sluman is also a fan of Formula One racing, and is friends with former Indianapolis 500 winner Bobby Rahal. He is also a collector of rare, fine wines with about 2,000 bottles in his collection.

Amateur wins (2)
1978 New York State Amateur
1980 Monroe Invitational

Professional wins (18)

PGA Tour wins (6)

PGA Tour playoff record (1–6)

Tournament Player Series wins (1)

Other wins (4)

Other playoff record (1–0)

Champions Tour wins (6)

Champions Tour playoff record (0–3)

Other senior wins (1)
2010 Nedbank Champions Challenge

Playoff record
Japan Golf Tour playoff record (0–1)

Major championships

Wins (1)

Results timeline

CUT = missed the half way cut
"T" indicates a tie for a place.

Summary

Most consecutive cuts made – 7 (1993 PGA – 1995 PGA)
Longest streak of top-10s – 2 (twice)

Results in The Players Championship

CUT = missed the halfway cut
"T" indicates a tie for a place

Results in World Golf Championships

1Cancelled due to 9/11

QF, R16, R32, R64 = Round in which player lost in match play
"T" = Tied
NT = No tournament

Results in senior major championships
Results not in chronological order before 2022.

CUT = missed the halfway cut
NT = No tournament
"T" indicates a tie for a place
NT = No tournament due to COVID-19 pandemic

See also
1982 PGA Tour Qualifying School graduates
1984 PGA Tour Qualifying School graduates
List of golfers with most PGA Tour wins
List of men's major championships winning golfers

References

External links

American male golfers
PGA Tour golfers
PGA Tour Champions golfers
Florida State Seminoles men's golfers
Winners of men's major golf championships
Golf writers and broadcasters
Golfers from Illinois
Golfers from New York (state)
Sportspeople from Rochester, New York
People from Hinsdale, Illinois
1957 births
Living people